Richfield is a ghost town located in the Cariboo region of British Columbia, Canada. The town is situated beside Williams Creek.

References

Ghost towns in British Columbia